Mount Craven is a village in Grenada. It is located on the island's north coast, in the Parish of Saint Patrick, near the parish capital, Sauteurs.

References

Populated places in Grenada